Demo-litions: Cast-off Recordings 1996–97 is a 2011 compilation album by the Crash Test Dummies. It consists of unreleased demos made during the songwriting process that eventually resulted in the album Give Yourself a Hand. The album was self-released via the band's website on April 19, 2011 as both a limited edition CD and MP3 download.

Background
Demo-litions features demos recorded by Crash Test Dummies between 1996–97. During this time, the band was trying to record a follow-up to A Worm's Life. Because that album didn't match the success of God Shuffled His Feet, the band's label BMG was much more restrictive towards the band and rejected 35 songs recorded during this time before finally settling on the album that would become Give Yourself a Hand.

Track listing

References 

2011 compilation albums
Crash Test Dummies compilation albums
Demo albums